Marco Bertolini (born 21 June 1953) is an Italian general, former commander of the Joint Operations Command (from 2004 to 2008) and of the Paratroopers Brigade "Folgore" (from 2002 to 2004).

References 

1953 births
Italian generals
Living people
Place of birth missing (living people)